La Moille High School, or LHS, is a public four-year high school located at 801 South Main Street in La Moille, Illinois, a village in Bureau County, Illinois, in the Midwestern United States. LHS serves the community and surrounding area of La Moille, Arlington, and Van Orin. The campus is located 30 miles northwest of Ottawa, Illinois, and serves a mixed village and rural residential community.

Academics
Mr. McCrackin is Superintendent/Principal of LaMoille High School.

Athletics
La Moille High School competes in the Little Ten Conference and is a member school in the Illinois High School Association. Their mascot is the Lions, with school colors of red and white. The school has no state championships on record in team athletics and activities.

Due to LHS' small enrollment, they coop with neighboring Amboy or Ohio high schools for most sports.

History
La Moille High School has no known consolidations in the recent past. Surrounding communities may have possessed high schools at some time which were consolidated into the current LHS. Potential reference/citation:

References

External links
 Official Website

Public high schools in Illinois
Schools in Bureau County, Illinois